Bystander intervention is a type of training used in post-secondary education institutions to prevent sexual assault or rape, binge drinking and harassment and unwanted comments of racist, homophobic, or transphobic nature. A bystander is a person who is present at an event, party, or other setting who notices a problematic situation, such as a someone making sexual advances on a drunk person. The bystander then takes on personal responsibility and takes action to intervene, with the goal of preventing the situation from escalating. 

The bystander who is intervening has several options, including distracting either of the people, getting help from others, checking in later, or directly intervening. There are risks to bystander intervention; it can lead to fights, it can ruin the mood for the people who were "intervened" into, and it can lead to confrontations.  Bystander intervention may also be called "bystander education", because the model is based on a system of educating trainers and leaders who will then go on to train people from their community.

Preventing sexual assault
One bystander intervention researcher suggests that a potential sexual assault be stopped by pretending to spill a drink on a drunk man who is trying to make sexual moves on an intoxicated woman, to distract him and "...stop bad behavior before it crosses the line from drunken partying to sexual assault". Advocates hope that bystander intervention programs can yield the same results on sexual assault that designated driver initiatives have had in reducing impaired driving; another similarity is that both programs do not discourage drinking itself, only the combination of drinking and law-breaking. Some US universities are introducing bystander education initiatives to comply with Title IX, which requires US universities which receive federal funding to not discriminate according to gender.

Research
A study on bystander intervention by the University of New Hampshire showed that 38 percent of the men who participated in a bystander intervention campaign training said they intervened to stop a sexual assault, versus only 12 percent of the control group (who did not see the campaign). An Ohio University study compared men who took a bystander intervention session with a group of men who did not have the training; 1.5 percent of the bystander intervention participants said they had committed sexual assault over the last four months, versus 6.7 percent from the untrained group. One challenge with bystander education programs is that a study has shown that white female students are less likely to intervene in a hypothetical situation where they see an intoxicated black woman being led towards a bedroom at a party by a non-intoxicated male, as white students feel "less personal responsibility" to help women of colour and they feel that the black woman is deriving pleasure from the situation.

See also
 Green Dot Bystander Intervention
 Bystander effect

References

Rape
Harm reduction
Violence
Educational programs